Cirrothauma magna is a species of deep-sea cirrate octopus that has been found in the Indian, Atlantic, and Pacific oceans. It is known from only 4 specimens. Their shells are somewhat saddle-shaped. C. magna is the sister taxon of Cirrothauma murrayi, but can be readily distinguished by having large and well developed eyes (whereas C. murrayi is near blind).

Cirrothauma magna is likely the largest species of cirrate octopus, one female specimen measuring 1.7 m total length.

References

Octopuses